Centrinaspis elegans is a species of true weevils in the subfamily Curculioninae. It is found in Brazil. The type specimen was collected in Chapada Campo.

References

External links 

 
 Centrinaspis elegans at insectoid.info
 Centrinaspis elegans at collections.si.edu

Beetles described in 1922
Curculioninae
Insects of Brazil